The 2020 Ferrari Challenge UK was the second season of Ferrari Challenge UK. The season started at Brands Hatch on 25 July and ended on 10 October at Snetterton. Lucky Khera won the Trofeo Pirelli title and Jamie Thwaites was the Coppa Shell champion.

Calendar

Entry list
All teams and drivers used the Ferrari 488 Challenge fitted with Pirelli tyres.

Results and standings

Race results

Championship standings
Points were awarded to the top ten classified finishers as follows:

References

External links
 Official website

UK 2020
Ferrari Challenge UK